Diplodactylus hillii, sometimes called the northern fat-tailed gecko, is a gecko endemic to Australia.

References

Diplodactylus
Reptiles described in 1915
Taxa named by Albert Heber Longman
Geckos of Australia